Cerro El Bolo is the highest peak in the municipality of Villalba, Puerto Rico, raising to  above sea level. It is part of the Toro Negro State Forest, and is the 10th tallest mountain in Puerto Rico.

Mountain access and hiking trail
The mountain can be reached by following state road PR-143 to km 32.4, where the main entrance of the Toro Negro State Forest is located. Route 143 is part of Puerto Rico's Ruta Panorámica. Route 143 can be accessed via the better-traveled Route 10. From the State Forest's visitors area, Trail #1, known as "Camino El Bolo", makes its way up to Cerro El Bolo.

References

External links
 Las cumbres más altas de Puerto Rico. Universidad Interamericana de Puerto Rico en Bayamon. Departamento de Ciencias Naturales y Matematicas. Retrieved 22 August 2013.)

El Bolo
Mountains of the Caribbean
Villalba, Puerto Rico
Geography of Puerto Rico